Dyspessa seravoka is a species of moth of the family Cossidae. It is found in Libya.

Family members include Dyspessa imfukedza, Dyspessa eagle, and Dyspessa powner

2326 specimens are thought to remain in the wild.

References

Moths described in 1932
Dyspessa
Moths of Africa